Mary Rawson is an American actress. She  played Cousin Mary Owl on the Neighborhood of Make-Believe on the children's television program Mister Rogers' Neighborhood.

External links
List of Mr. Rogers characters - Cousin Mary Owl 

Year of birth missing (living people)
Living people
American television actresses
Place of birth missing (living people)
20th-century American actresses